"One True Love" is a song written and recorded by American country music duo The O'Kanes.  It was released in March 1988 as the first single from the album Tired of the Runnin'.  The song reached number 4 on the Billboard Hot Country Singles & Tracks chart.

Charts

Weekly charts

Year-end charts

References

1988 singles
1988 songs
The O'Kanes songs
Songs written by Kieran Kane
Songs written by Jamie O'Hara (singer)
Columbia Records singles